Lists of notable alumni and faculty of the California Institute of the Arts.

School of Art

Alumni

 Angus Andrew
 B+
 Judie Bamber
 Richard Barnbrook
 Sadie Barnette
 Julie Becker (BFA, MFA)
 Cindy Bernard
 Ashley Bickerton
 Jeremy Blake (MFA 95, Art)
 Nayland Blake (MFA 84, Art)
 Ross Bleckner (MFA 73, Art)
 Barbara Bloom (BFA 72, Art)
 John S. Boskovich (MFA, Art)
 Andrea Bowers
 Mark Bradford
 Troy Brauntuch
 Sherry Brody
  Julia Brown
 Laurie Halsey Brown
 Krista Buecking (MFA 2012, Art)
 John Burtle
 James Casebere (MFA 79, Art)
 Heather Cassils (MFA 2002, Art)
 Audrey Chan
 Nancy Chunn
 Jill Ciment
 Timothy Clark
 Fiona Connor
 Bernard Cooper
 Sofia Coppola (did not graduate) 92, Photography and Media)
 Meg Cranston
 Denise Gonzales Crisp
 Zoe Crosher
 Dorit Cypis
 Danielle Dean (MFA 2012)
 Karla Diaz, MFA 2004
 Richard K. Diran, 1972, painting
 Tomory Dodge
 Roy Dowell
 Zackary Drucker
 John Duncan
 Sam Durant (MFA 91, Art)
 Elana Dykewomon
 Mark Edward
 Kenneth Feingold
 Christina Fernandez
 Eric Fischl (BFA 72, Art)
 Mario García Torres (MFA 2005)
 Jill Giegerich
 Liz Glynn (MFA 08)
 Shane Guffogg
 Jack Goldstein
 Ramiro Gomez
 Guillermo Gomez-Peña (BFA 81, MFA 83)
 Sharon Grace (1972)
 Todd Gray (MFA 89, Photography and Media)
 Tony Greene
 Johnnie Jungleguts
 Kira Lynn Harris
 Asher Hartman
 Lyle Ashton Harris
 Kim Hastreiter
 Richard Hawkins (MFA 88)
 Johanna Hedva
 Mary Beth Heffernan
 Heather Henson
 Kenyatta A.C. Hinkle
 Channa Horwitz
 Doug Ischar (BFA 87)
 Jim Isermann
 Michael Jang
  Larry Johnson
 Michael Adam Kandel
 Young Kakit
 Carol Kaufman (BFA '74)
 Mike Kelley (MFA 78, Art)
 Robert Glenn Ketchum (MFA 73, Photography and Media)
 Susan Kinsolving
 Alice Könitz
 Suzanne Lacy (MFA '73)
 Alice Lang
 James Lapine
 Jonathan Lasker
 Elad Lassry
 Karen LeCocq
 Jenny Lens
 Laida Lertxundi
  Robert Levine
 Jen Liu
 Michael Mandiberg (MFA 03, Photography and Media)
 Elana Mann
 Daniel Joseph Martinez (BFA 79, Photography and Media)
 Kent Matsuoka
 Rodney McMillian (MFA 02, Art)
 Josephine Meckseper (MFA 92)
 John Miller (MFA 79, Art)
 Adia Millett
 Susan Mogul
 Noreen Morioka
 Farhad Moshiri
 Dwayne Moser (MFA 2001)
 Carter Mull
 Matt Mullican
 Yurie Nagashima
 Ray Navarro
 Kali Nikitas (MFA 90, Graphic Design)
 Stephen Nowlin
 Catherine Opie (MFA 88, Photography and Media)
 Rubén Ortiz-Torres (MFA 92, Art)
 Tony Oursler (BFA 79, Art)
 Jan Oxenberg
 Esteban Ramón Pérez
 Ariel Pink
 Lari Pittman (MFA 76)
 Michael Polish (BFA 92, Art)
 Gala Porras-Kim (MFA 09, Art)
 Monique Prieto (BFA and MFA, Art)
 Stephen Prina
 Joe Ray (BFA 73, Art)
 Ry Rocklen
 Amy Keating Rogers
 G. Samantha Rosenthal
 Leo Rubinfien (BFA 1974, Photography)
 Christoph Ruckhäberle
 Shizu Saldamando (MFA 2005)
 David Salle (BFA 73, MFA 75, Art)
 Louise Sandhaus(MFA 94, Graphic Design)
 Adrian Saxe
 Mira Schor (MFA 73)
 Peter Seidler, founder of Avalanche Systems
 Ilene Segalove
 Stephen Selkowitz (Environmental Design, MFA 72)
 Jim Shaw
 Nikita Shokhov
 Susan Silas
 Gary Simmons
 Patrice Stellest
 Haruko Tanaka
 Henry Taylor
 Clarissa Tossin
 Klaus vom Bruch
 Carrie Mae Weems (BFA 81, Photography and Media)
 Kaari Upson
 James Welling (BFA 72, MFA 74, Photography and Media)
 Dirk Westphal
 Richard Ray Whitman
 John Wiese
 Faith Wilding
 Christopher Williams
 Megan Williams, B.F.A., 1978
 Audrey Wollen
 Rio Yañez
 Nancy Youdelman
 Ethan Young (BFA 92, Art)
 Tim Zuck

Faculty

 Vito Acconci
 Laurie Anderson
 Richard Artschwager
 Michael Asher
 David Askevold
 John Baldessari
 Lynda Benglis
 Natalie Bookchin
 Jonathan Borofsky
 Paul Brach
 Judy Chicago
 Robert H. Cumming
 Louis Danziger
 Sheila Levrant de Bretteville
 Richard Farson
 Ed Fella
 Gerald Ferguson
 Karen Finley
 Judy Fiskin
 Simone Forti
 Anthony Friedkin
 Charles Gaines
 Harry Gamboa, Jr.
 Jeremy Gilbert-Rolfe
 April Greiman
 Fritz Haeg
 John Van Hamersveld
 Paula Harper
 Douglas Huebler
 Ashley Hunt
 Tom Jennings
 Matsumi Kanemitsu
 Allan Kaprow
 Jeffery Keedy
 Martin Kersels
 Alison Knowles
 Barbara Kruger
 Thomas Lawson
  Joe Lewis
 Roy Lichtenstein
 Sharon Lockhart
 Catherine Lord
 John Mandel
 Laurie Haycock Makela
 Paul McCarthy
 Bruce Nauman
 Jayme Odgers
 Nam June Paik
 Victor Papanek
 Peter Jon Pearce
 Judy Pfaff
 Susan Rothenberg
 Miriam Schapiro
 Alan Schoen
 Allan Sekula
 Pat Steir
 Wolfgang Stoerchle
 Gail Swanlund
 Martine Syms
 Shirley Tse
 Stan Vanderbeek
 Peter Van Riper
 Lorraine Wild
 Emmett Williams
 Millie Wilson
 Krzysztof Wodiczko
 Emerson Woelffer

School of Critical Studies

Alumni

 Rose Anderson (MFA 18)
 Andrew Berardini (MFA 06)
 Colin Dickey (MFA 00)
 Ken Ehrlich (MFA 99)
 Kenyatta A.C. Hinkle (MFA 13)
 Amanda Yates Garcia (MFA 06)
 Henry Hoke (MFA 11)
 Soo Kim (MFA 95)
 Douglas Kearney (MFA 04)
 Grace Krilanovich (MFA 05)
 Eric Lindley, aka Careful (MFA 08)
 Karl Montevirgen (MFA 00)
 Dennis Phillips
 Allie Rowbottom (MFA 11)
 Alan Toy (BFA 73)
 Stephen van Dyck (MFA 09)

Faculty

 Bruce Bauman
 Dodie Bellamy
 Susie Bright
 Sue-Ellen Case
 Robert Christgau
 Gabrielle Civil
 Sande Cohen
 Thomas E. Crow
 Steve Erickson
 Clayton Eshleman
 Brian Evenson
 María Irene Fornés
 Daniel Foss
 Peter Gadol
 Paula Harper
 Mark Harris
 Dick Hebdige
 Dick Higgins
 Sikivu Hutchinson
 Norman M. Klein
 Max Kozloff
 Saul Landau
 Anthony McCann
 Deena Metzger
 Larry Miller
 Maggie Nelson
 Carl Oglesby
 Arlene Raven
 Janet Sarbanes
 Jeremy J. Shapiro 
 Matthew Shenoda
 David St. John
 Maurice R. Stein
 Michael Stock
 Jalal Toufic
 Luisa Valenzuela
 Matias Viegener
 Robert Walter
 John Willett
 Christine Wertheim
 Emmett Williams

The Sharon Lund School of Dance

Alumni

 Thomas Jefferson Byrd
 Jacques Heim (MFA 91)
 Dante Henderson
 Cris Horwang
 Jay Evan Jackson
 Alonzo King

Faculty

 Donald Byrd
 Colin Connor
 George de la Peña
 Bella Lewitzky
 Donald McKayle
 Mia Čorak Slavenska
 Allegra Fuller Snyder
 Rebecca Wright

School of Film/Video

Alumni

 Andrew Ahn (Film Directing)
 Asitha Ameresekere (Film Directing)
 Steve F. Anderson (MFA '90, Film & Video)
 Steve J. Anderson (Character Animation)
 Bryan Andrews (Character Animation)
 Mark Andrews (BFA 93, Character Animation)
 Tony Anselmo (Character Animation)
 Wes Archer (Experimental Animation)
 David A. Armstrong
 Kelly Asbury (Character Animation)
 Jom Tob Azulay
 Chris Bailey (Character Animation)
 Kyle Balda (Character Animation)
 Steve Balderson (96, Film & Video)
 Tom Bancroft (Character Animation)
 Tony Bancroft (Character Animation)
 Adam Beckett (BFA 74, Experimental Animation)
 Nancy Beiman (Character Animation)
 Bruce Berman (73, Live Action)
 Tom Bertino (Animation)
 Anna Biller  (Interschool, Film & Video, Art)
 Brad Bird (76, Character Animation)
 Kevin Bjorke
 Timothy Björklund (Experimental Animation)
 Robert Blalack (Experimental Animation)
 Kat Blaque (BFA 12, Character Animation)
 Colin Brady (Character Animation)
 Matt Braly (BFA 10, Film & Video)
 Ash Brannon (Character Animation)
 Patrick Brice (Film & Video)
 Q. Allan Brocka
 Bill Brown (MFA 97, Film & Video)
 Pete Browngardt (BFA 2000, Character Animation)
 Chris Buck (78, Character Animation)
 Tim Burton (79, Character Animation)
 James Caliri
 Doug Campbell (BFA 85, Live Action)
 Brenda Chapman (BFA 87, Character Animation)
 Yarrow Cheney
 Daniel Chong
 Peter Chung (81, Experimental Animation)
 Kerry Conran (Film & Video)
 Donovan Cook (92, Character Animation)
 Sophia Coppola
 Gabriel Cowan (Film Directing)
 Joel Crawford
 Larry Cuba (Experimental Animation)
 Jill Culton (Character Animation)
 Sean Daniel (BFA 73, Film & Video)
 David Daniels (Experimental Animation)
 Eric Darnell (MFA 90, Experimental Animation)
 Jeff DeGrandis
 Anthony DeRosa (Character Animation)
 Sue DiCicco (Character Animation)
 Kirby Dick (Film/Video)
 Mark Dindal (Character Animation)
 Pete Docter (BFA 90, Character Animation)
 Walt Dohrn
 Kate Dollenmayer (BFA 05 Film & Video)
 Russ Edmonds (BFA 87, Character Animation)
 Ralph Eggleston (86, Character Animation)
 Rhys Ernst (MFA 2011)
 Rodney Evans (MFA 96, Film & Video)
 Lauren Faust (95, Character Animation)
 F. X. Feeney (Film & Video)
 Michael Fitzpatrick
 Steven Fonti
 David Frankel
 Thor Freudenthal
 Javier Fuentes-León
 Randy Fullmer (Character Animation)
 Dede Gardner
 Joaquin "Kino" Gil
 Benjamin Gluck
 Adam Samuel Goldman (MFA, Film & Video)
 Jason Goldwatch
 Stefan Gruber (Experimental Animation)
 Aurora Guerrero
 Sara Gunnarsdóttir
 Jon Gustafsson (Film Directing)
 Jorge R. Gutierrez (BFA 97, MFA 00, Experimental Animation)
 Bret Haaland
 Tanya Haden (Experimental Animation)
 Curt Hahn (BFA, Film & Video)
 Don Hall (BFA 95, Character Animation)
 Steve Hanft (Film & Video)
 Sammy Harkham
 Vashti Harrison
 Butch Hartman (BFA 87, Character Animation)
 Rick Heinrichs (79, Character Animation)
 Mark Henn (BFA 80, Character Animation)
 Hal Hickel (Experimental Animation, 82)
 Helen Hill (MFA 95, Experimental Animation)
 Stephen Hillenburg (MFA 92, Experimental Animation)
 Alex Hirsch (BFA 07, Character Animation)
 Eliza Hittman (MFA Directing)
 Carole Holliday
 Savage Steve Holland (Experimental Animation)
 Roger Holzberg (BFA 76)
 Chris Innis (MFA 91, Live Action/Film)
 David Irving
 Richard Isanove
 Rick Jacobson
 Richard Jefferies (BFA 78, Experimental Animation)
 Glen Keane (74, Experimental Animation)
 Carole Kim (MFA 2003, Film/Video, Integrated Media)
 Gina Kim (MFA 99, Film & Video)
 Mark Tapio Kines (BFA 92, Experimental Animation)
 Mark Kirkland (BFA 78, Experimental Animation)
 David Kirkpatrick (BFA 74)
 Arlene Klasky (Experimental Animation)
 Jorgen Klubien (BFA, Character Animation)
 Bill Kopp (BFA, Character Animation)
 Alexis Krasilovsky
 Amy Kravitz (MFA 86, Experimental Animation)
 Nandita Kumar
 Chris Langdon
 Lorne Lanning (Character Animation)
 John Lasseter (BFA 79, Character Animation)
 Doug Lefler
 Eric Leiser (2005, Experimental Animation)
 Jay Lender
 Kristen Lepore (MFA 12, Experimental Animation)
 Kevin Lima (Character Animation)
 Matthew Luhn (Character Animation)
 James Mangold (BFA 85, Film & Video)
 Dinah Manoff
 Michael Marcantel (Experimental Animation)
 April March (one year, Character Animation)
 James Marsh
 Stu Maschwitz (Animation)
 Miwa Matreyek (MFA 07, Experimental Animation)
 Craig McCracken (92, Character Animation)
 Tom McGrath (BFA 92, Character Animation)
 Patrick McHale (Character Animation)
 Eon McKai (Film & Video)
 Alessandro Mercuri (MFA 00, Live Action)
 Chris Miller (Character Animation)
 Rusty Mills
 Rob Minkoff (83, Character Animation)
 Mike Mitchell
 Adrian Molina
 Laura Molina (Character Animation)
 Zac Moncrief (Character Animation)
 Rich Moore (Character Animation)
 C. Scott Morse (Character Animation)
 Soudabeh Moradian (MFA 15, Film and Video)
 Thom Mount (MFA 73, Live Action)
 M. David Mullen (MFA 91, Film & Video)
 Nirvan Mullick (Experimental Animation)
 Mike L. Murphy (Character Animation)
 John Musker (BFA, 79, Character Animation)
 Adam Muto (Character Animation)
 Daron Nefcy (Character Animation)
 Drew Neumann (BFA 82, Film & Video)
 Teddy Newton (Character Animation)
 Sue C. Nichols
 Michael Nguyen (88, Character Animation)
 Julien Nitzberg (Film Directing)
 Mark O'Hare (Character Animation)
 Gregory Orr (Film & Video)
 Mark Osborne (BFA 92, Experimental Animation)
 Akosua Adoma Owusu
 Sergio Pablos
 Skyler Page
 Andrea Pallaoro
 Christine Panushka (MFA 83, Experimental Animation)
 Eric Patrick (MFA 97, Experimental Animation)
 Michael Patterson (Experimental Animation)
 Korky Paul (Experimental Animation)
 Michael Peraza
 Bob Persichetti (BFA 96, Character Animation)
 Nicholas Peterson (Experimental Animation)
 Jeff Pidgeon
 Michael Pressman
 Joanna Priestley (MFA 85, Experimental Animation)
 Luis Prieto
 Rubén Procopio
 Dave Pruiksma (Character Animation)
 Jory Prum
 Tom Lin Shu-yu
 Marco Simon Puccioni
 J. G. Quintel (BFA 05, Character Animation)
 Kevin Rafferty
 Joe Ranft (80, Character Animation)
 Jim Reardon (Character Animation)
 Jerry Rees (77, Character Animation)
 Rob Renzetti (Character Animation)
 Mike Rianda
 Jose Rivera
 Lou Romano (94, Character Animation)
 Simon Rouby
 Paul Rudish (Character Animation)
 Rajee Samarasinghe (Film & Video)
 Chris Sanders (Character Animation)
 Peter Sarkisian
 Mitch Schauer (Character Animation)
 Allison Schulnik(BFA 00, Experimental Animation)
 Gary Schwartz (Experimental Animation)
 George Scribner
 Henry Selick (MFA 77, Experimental Animation)
 Maneesh Sharma
 Brian Sheesley (Character Animation)
 Lee Sheldon (MFA Film Directing)
 Bruce W. Smith (Character Animation)
 Peter Sohn (BFA 99, Character Animation)
 Aaron Springer (Character Animation)
 Anthony Stacchi (BFA 86, Character Animation)
 Andrew Stanton (BFA 87, Character Animation)
 Eric Stefani (91, Character Animation)
 Jennifer Steinkamp (Experimental Animation)
 Patrice Stellest (Experimental Animation)
 Robert Stromberg
 Steven Subotnick (BFA 84, MFA 86, Experimental Animation)
 Doug Sweetland (Character Animation)
 Shion Takeuchi
 Rea Tajiri
 Genndy Tartakovsky (92, Character Animation)
 Ann Telnaes (BFA 85, Character Animation)
 Paul Tibbitt (Character Animation)
 Bill Tiller (BFA 92, Character Animation)
 Shannon Tindle (99, Character Animation)
 Bill Tomlinson
 Donna Tracy (Experimental Animation)
 Gary Trousdale (82, Character Animation)
 Cynthia True (Character Animation)
 Naomi Uman
 Nassos Vakalis (Character Animation)
 Darrell Van Citters (BFA 76, Character Animation)
 Thurop Van Orman (Character Animation)
 Gregg Vanzo (Character Animation)
 Conrad Vernon (Character Animation)
 J.J. Villard (BFA 04, Character Animation)
 Momo Wang (MFA 14, Experimental Animation)
 Pendleton Ward (BFA 05, Character Animation)
 Dave Wasson
 Stevie Wermers
 Erik Wiese
 Travis Wilkerson
 David Hildebrand Wilson (MFA 76, Experimental Animation), founder-curator of the Museum of Jurassic Technology.
 Kirk Wise (CRT 85, Character Animation)
 Ellen Woodbury (Experimental Animation)
 Fred Worden (Film & Video)
 Justin Wright
 Laurence Wright
 Eric Yahnker

Faculty

 Michael Almereyda
 Thom Andersen
 Dale Baer
 Jerry Beck
 James Benning
 Kathryn Bigelow
 Betzy Bromberg
 Nancy Buchanan
 Charles Burnett
 Ben Caldwell
 James Caliri
 Ciro Cappellari
 Johanna Demetrakas
 Gill Dennis
 Ed Emshwiller
 Jules Engel
 Maureen Furniss
 Juan Pablo González
 Jack Hannah
 Mark Jonathan Harris
 T. Hee
 Monte Hellman
 Peter Hutton
 Bill Jackson
 Mike Johnson
 Bob Kurtz
 Deborah LaVine
 Don Levy
 Joan Logue
 Alexander Mackendrick
 John Lee Mahin
 Nina Menkes
 E. Michael Mitchell
 William Moritz
 Pat O'Neill
 Robert Nelson
 Mark Osborne
 Rumen Petkov
 Ernest Pintoff
 Suzan Pitt
 Jon Reiss
 Terry Sanders
 Janice Tanaka
 Bill Viola
 Billy Woodberry
 Gene Youngblood

The Herb Alpert School of Music

Alumni

 John Luther Adams (BFA 73)
 Ralph Alessi (BFA 87, MFA 90)
 Francis Awe
 Ryan Bancroft (BFA 11, MFA 13)
 Ronnie Blake
 Kevin Blechdom
 Gene Bowen
 Dustin Boyer
 Anthony Brandt
 Michael Cain (BFA 88, MFA 90)
 Mario Calire
 David Carlson
 Raven Chacon
 Pearl Charles
 Nicholas Frances Chase, aka N.F. Chase (MFA Music 00)
 Sharon Cheslow
 Ken Christianson (MFA Music Composition)
 Curtis Clark
 Randy Cohen
 Scott Colley (BFA 88)
 Ravi Coltrane (BFA 90)
 Mark Coniglio (BFA 89)
 Jim Cooper of Detholz! (one semester; dropout)
 Mikal Cronin
 John Debney (BFA 78)
 Gail Ann Dorsey
 Dean Drummond
 Kiki Ebsen (BFA 85)
 Juárez Echenique
 Guy Eckstine '75
 Pedro Eustache
 Jill Fraser
 Adam Fong
 Russ Freeman
 Josh Gabriel
 Peter Garland (BFA 73)
 Julia Holter
 Steve Horowitz
 Earl Howard (74, Composition)
 Melissa Hui (MFA 90)
 Art Jarvinen
 Terry Jennings
 Kerstin Jeppsson
 Aaron Johnson
 Kevin Kmetz
 Greg Kurstin
 Thomas Leeb (BFA '03)
 Chris Lemmon
 David C. Lewis
 Eric Lindley
 Hugh Livingston
 Paul Livingstone
 Carey Lovelace
 Carla Lucero (BFA 86, Composition)
 Lusine
 Ed Mann
 Arturo Márquez (MFA 90)
 Ingram Marshall (MFA 71)
 John Maus
 Gabrial McNair (of No Doubt) ('95)
 Roger Miller (76, Composition)
 Ann Millikan (MFA)
 Maryam Mirbagheri (2018, Performer-Composer / 2016 Composition)
 John Morton'78
 Zane Musa
 Mark Nauseef
 Anna Oxygen
 Charlemagne Palestine
 Kolleen Park
 Chan Poling
 Lisa Popeil
 Pirayeh Pourafar (MFA 00)
 Raaginder
 Ellen Reid
 Laura Rizzotto (BFA '15)
 Curtis Roads
 Michael Eric Robinson
 Sharon Robinson
 Marina Rosenfeld (MFA 94, Art-Music)
 Dean Rosenthal (MFA 97 - Did Not Graduate)
 Anni Rossi
 Joel Rubin
 Adam Rudolph (MFA 88)
 Otmaro Ruíz (MFA 91)
 Salvador Santana
 Matthew Setzer
 Daniel Shulman
 Todd Sickafoose
 Mark So (MFA 06)
 Rand Steiger (MFA 82)
 Adam Stern (BFA 75; MFA 77, conductor)
 Carl Stone (BFA 75)
 L. Subramaniam
 Mia Theodoratus
 Oliver Tree
 Stephen van Dyck, founder of Los Angeles road concerts (MFA 09)
 André Vida (MFA 2005)
 Lois V Vierk
 Gregg Wager
 Marty Walker (MFA 91)
 Jeremy Wall of Spyro Gyra
 William Winant
 Nate Wood
 Benjamin Wynn (BFA 2002)
 Yulianna
 Marcelo Zarvos (BFA 92)
 Z'EV
 Jeremy Zuckerman (MFA '01)

Faculty

 John Bergamo
 Robert E. Brown
 Gene Bowen
 Harold Budd
 Igor Buketoff
 Edward Carroll
 Daniel Corral
 Swapan Chaudhuri
 Bill Douglas
 John Fumo
 Susan Allen
 Vinny Golia
 Charlie Haden
 Laurel Halo
 Leonid Hambro
 Alex Iles
 Alphonso Johnson
 Eyvind Kang
 Daniel Katzen
 Ulrich Krieger
 Joe LaBarbera
 Anne LeBaron
 Daniel Lentz
 Bennie Maupin
 Roscoe Mitchell
 Buell Neidlinger
 James Newton
 Marni Nixon
 Frederick Noad
 K. P. H. Notoprojo
 Michael Pisaro
 Mel Powell
 T. Ranganathan
 Taranath Rao
 David Rosenboom
 Frederic Rzewski
 Trichy Sankaran
 Wadada Leo Smith
 Rand Steiger
 Richard Stoltzman
 Volker Straebel
 Morton Subotnick
 Miroslav Tadić
 Rajeev Taranath
 Serge Tcherepnin
 James Tenney
 Frederick D. Tinsley
 Mark Trayle
 T. Viswanathan
 Allan Vogel
 Wolfgang von Schweinitz
 Michele Zukovsky

School of Theater Arts

Alumni

 Kevin Adams (MFA 86, Scene Design)
 Amanda Aday (Acting)
 Perry Anzilotti
 Brandon Stirling Baker (Lighting)
 Kathy Baker (72, Acting)
 Cameron Bancroft (BFA 90, Acting)
 Dorie Barton (actress, director) (BFA)
 Jesse Borrego (84, Acting)
 Barbara Bosson (Acting)
 Alison Brie (BFA 05, Acting)
 Natalia Cordova-Buckley
 Merritt Butrick (Acting)
 Stephanie Barton-Farcas (Acting)
 Tiffany Boone
 Michael Carmine
 Matthew Causey
 Don Cheadle (BFA 86, Acting)
 Eliza Coupe (BFA 06, Acting)
 Jennifer Elise Cox (BFA 91, Acting)
 Juli Crockett
 Michael Cudlitz (Acting)
 Frank Darabont
 Emilio Delgado
 Sam Doumit
 Randall Edwards
 Shahine Ezell
 Patricia Fernández
 Dennis Gersten
 Richard Green
 Virginia Grise (09, MFA Writing for Performance)
 Dana Gourrier
 Aleshea Harris (MFA, 2014)
 Ed Harris (BFA 75, Acting)
 David Hasselhoff (73, Acting)
 Roger Holzberg (BFA 76, Writing)
 Cindy Im
 Albert Innaurato
 Bill Irwin (72, Acting)
 Jules de Jongh
 Elaine Kao
 Simbi Khali-Williams (BFA 93, Acting)
 Don Lake
 Michael Lassell (MFA '73, Acting)
 Scott MacDonald (Acting)
 Derek Magyar
 Andrew Matarazzo
 Justine Miceli
 Kim Milford (Acting)
 Dana Morosini (Acting)
 Laraine Newman (Acting)
 Stephanie Niznik
 Sharon Ott
 Condola Rashād (BFA 08, Acting)
 Diona Reasonover
 Paul Reubens (Pee Wee Herman) (73, Acting)
 Michael Richards (73, Acting)
 Christopher Rivas
 Michael D. Roberts (Acting)
 Douglas Rushkoff, writer, social theorist
 Katey Sagal (Acting)
 Tobe Sexton (BFA 91)
 Mark Allen Shepherd
 Jan Smithers
 Cecily Strong (BFA 06, Acting)
 Monty Taylor (Lighting Design)
 Julie Taymor
 Amanda Tepe
 Allan Trautman
 Winston Tong
 Mageina Tovah
 Deborah Joy Winans (MFA Acting 09)

Faculty

 Christopher Akerlind
 Libby Appel
 Fran Bennett
 Herbert Blau
 Lee Breuer
 Ruby Cohn
 Erik Ehn
 Janie Geiser
 Lisa Gay Hamilton
 Donald Holder
 Marshall Ho'o
 Sally Jacobs
 Mirjana Joković
 Franz Marijnen
 Suzan-Lori Parks
 Carl Hancock Rux
 Lap Chi Chu
 Lars Jan

Honorary degrees

A list of past honorary degree recipients include:

 Beverly Sills (1975)
 Roy Lichtenstein (1977)
 Twyla Tharp (1978)
 Gordon Davidson (1980)
 Bella Lewitzky (1981)
 Haskell Wexler (1981)
Henry Mancini (1983)
Jan de Gaetani (1983)
Ravi Shankar (1985)
John Cage (1986)
Frank O. Gehry (1987)
Trisha Brown (1988)
Donn Tatum (1989)
Luis Valdez (1989)
Paul Taylor (1989)
Ornette Coleman (1990)
Ustad Ali Akbar Khan (1991)
Pearl Primus (1991)
Adrian Piper (1992)
Ray Bradbury (1992)
Yvonne Rainer (1993)
Steven Bochco (1993)
Stan Brakhage (1994)
Vija Celmins (1994)
Betye Saar (1995)
Carolyn Forche (1995)
Laurie Anderson (1996)
Elvin Jones (1996)
Chantal Akerman (1997)
Lee Breuer (1998)
Ed Ruscha (1999)
Bill Viola (2000)
Steve Reich (2000)
Ry Cooder (2001)
Faith Hubley (2001)
Bruce Nauman (2001)
Alice Coltrane (2002)
Roy E. Disney (2003)
Anna Halprin (2003)
Carolee Schneemann (2003)
Christian Wolff (2004)
Daniel Nagrin (2004)
James Newton (2005)
Julius Shulman (2005)
Rudy VanderLans (2006)
Rudy Perez (2006)
Alonzo King (2007)
Harry Belafonte (2008)
Herbert Blau (2008)
Terry Riley (2008)
Elizabeth LeCompte (2009)
Morton Subotnick (2009)
Trimpin (2010)
Annette Bening (2011)
Donald McKayle (2011)
Peter Sellars (2012)
Eric Fischl (2013)
John Lasseter (2014)
David Hildebrand Wilson (2015)
Sheila Levrant de Bretteville (2015)
Wadada Leo Smith (2016)
Don Cheadle (2016)
Edgar Heap of Birds (2018)
Wayne Shorter (2022)
Charles Lloyd (2022)
Esperanza Spalding (2022)

References

External links
CalArts Website - School of Art Alumni
CalArts Website - School of Dance Alumni
CalArts Website - School of Film/Video Alumni
CalArts Website - School of Music Alumni
CalArts Website - School of Theater Alumni
CalArts Graphic Design Almanac - a list of all graphic design alumni and faculty

Arts-related lists
Lists of people by university or college in California